Spokes is the fifth studio album by British electronic music duo Plaid. It was released on Warp in 2003.

Critical reception
At Metacritic, which assigns a weighted average score out of 100 to reviews from mainstream critics, the album received an average score of 72% based on 10 reviews, indicating "generally favorable reviews".

Mark Richardson of Pitchfork gave the album a 6.2 out of 10, saying: "A consistent mood is carried through most of these ten tracks, and it can be characterized with words familiar to people who listen to a lot of IDM: reflective and mysterious, with an occasional tension verging on paranoia."

Track listing

References

External links
 
 

2003 albums
Plaid (band) albums
Warp (record label) albums
Albums with cover art by The Designers Republic